Machiavelli and the Four Seasons is the third studio album by the Australian rock group TISM (This Is Serious Mum). It was released on 4 May 1995.

Background and release 
TISM worked on what would become their next album at Metropolis Audio between December 1992 and September 1993 with various producers, including Tony Cohen, Laurence Maddy and Paul McKercher. Tracks known from these sessions include "Jung Talent Time", "Aussiemandias", "Abscess Makes the Heart Grow Fonder" and "State Schools are Great Schools". The group became dissatisfied with the hard rock sound they had cultivated with Cohen and realised after playing alongside Soundgarden on the Big Day Out in January 1994 that they did not want to be associated with grunge, which was at the height of its popularity at the time. The group abandoned work on the album and started recording new demos in a techno-influenced alternative dance style after returning from the Big Day Out. Three months later, their demos were wiped by a computer virus.

In September 1994, the group recorded Machiavelli and the Four Seasons at Platinum Studios. The final track list included "Jung Talent Time" and "Aussiemandias" from the September 1993 sessions. The chorus to "How Do I Love Thee" is taken from the end of the second movement of "Opium is the Religion of the Masses", a song written by TISM in 1983 and played during the Great Truckin' Songs of the Renaissance tour in 1988.

A song entitled "Russia" was intended to be the last song on the album, but was removed for legal reasons due to the song's chorus, which was seen to be similar to "Back in the USSR" by The Beatles. It remained unreleased until 2009, when an edited version, retitled "The Last Soviet Star", was released as an iTunes bonus. The original version, however, was uploaded to an old version of the TISM website, appeared on promotional pressings released in late 1994, and is known to have been played during TISM's set at the 1993 Big Day Out, at Melbourne Showgrounds (a diatribe recited at this concert, "The Greatest Victorian Alive", appeared on Australia the Lucky Cunt).

The title is a composite phrase of doo wop group Frankie Valli and the Four Seasons and thinker Niccolò Machiavelli. The cover of the album is a picture of The Hollywood Argyles.

Singles 
 "Jung Talent Time" was released in February 1995 as the album's lead single.

 "(He'll Never Be An) Ol' Man River" was released in June 1995. The album peaked at number 23 on the ARIA Charts.) 

 "Greg! The Stop Sign!!" was released in August 1995. The song peaked at number 59 on the ARIA Charts and was nominated for an ARIA Award at the ARIA Music Awards of 1996.

 "Garbage" was released in January 1996

 "All Homeboys Are Dickheads" was pressed up and prepared for sale, but for reasons unknown, prior to shipping, TISM ordered that the single be deleted. Copies of the single did make their way into the hands of TISM fans. It was also released as a promo with Machines Against the Rage.

Reception

The album was a commercial success, peaking at number 8 on the ARIA Charts and was certified Gold in 1996. To celebrate Machiavelli going "gold", it was re-released with a bonus disc in January 1996. The album was re-released again in December 1996 with a live album.

At the ARIA Music Awards of 1995, the album won the ARIA Award for Best Independent Release. Three of its songs reached Triple J Hottest 100, 1995, two of them in the top 10. 

Jonathan Lewis from AllMusic said TISM "had generated a strong cult following during the 14 years of their existence prior to the release of this album, but commercial success had proved elusive.. but for Machiavelli and the Four Seasons, the band chose to embrace dance music and the resulting commercial success this album enjoyed came as a shock, at least to the band, if to no one else." Lewis opined the album "sees TISM at their wittiest since Great Truckin' Songs of the Renaissance" adding "Their lyrics are smart and their use of musical trends extremely clever... Funny, clever, and just tasteless enough to make it interesting, Machiavelli and the Four Seasons was easily the best TISM album of the '90s."

In 2021, the album was ranked #74 on Rolling Stone's 200 Greatest Australian Albums of All Time, with Tyler Jenke stating the album was "another musical evolution for the group, combining the whip-smart social satire they employed within their lyrics and pairing it with compositions that coupled commercial appeal with stellar musicianship and artistry" and concluding his writing saying the band "had crafted one of the decade’s best and most memorable albums, and their success and recognition was truly deserved.

On January 10, 2023, Paul Simpson highlighted the album as one of AllMusic's Staff Picks of that week, comparing the band to the likes of the Justified Ancients of Mu Mu and Chumbawamba, "but more absurd and tasteless" and that the band "embraced rave culture in the mid-‘90s and unexpectedly hit the top ten with their gold-selling third album." He highlights “(He’ll Never Be An) Ol’ Man River” as the breakthrough hit, but said "the best song is “Garbage”, a thrashing breakbeat techno track with lyrics condemning classic rock and the endless recycling of nostalgia."

Track listing

Original album

1996 Bonus Disc

Personnel 
 Peter Minack - lead vocals
 James Paull - guitar, backing vocals, vocal arrangements ("Philip Glass's Arse")
 John Holt - bass, backing vocals
 Damian Cowell - drums, lead vocals, backing vocals
 Eugene Cester - keyboards, backing vocals
 Christine Storey - soprano vocals ("Philip Glass's Arse")
 Belinda Gillam - alto vocals ("Philip Glass's Arse")
 Ewan Harwood - tenor vocals ("Philip Glass's Arse")
 Bruce Raggatt - bass vocals ("Philip Glass's Arse")
 Produced by TISM
 Recorded by Laurence Maddy except "Jung Talent Time" and "Aussiemandias" by Paul McKercher

Charts

Certifications

Release history

References

1995 albums
ARIA Award-winning albums
TISM albums
Shock Records albums